Tiran may refer to:

Places

Iran
 Tiran and Karvan County, county in Isfahan Province, Iran, with its capital Tiran
 Tiran, Iran, a city in Isfahan Province, Iran
 Tiran, Kerman, a village in Kerman Province, Iran
 Tiran, Lorestan, a village in Lorestan Province, Iran
 Tiran, Mazandaran, a village in Mazandaran Province, Iran
 Tiran, Razavi Khorasan, a village in Razavi Khorasan Province, Iran

Red Sea
 Tiran Island, an island at the mouth of the Gulf of Aqaba formerly administered by Egypt, but now administered by Saudi Arabia following a peaceful transfer in 2017
 Straits of Tiran, The opening to the Gulf of Aqaba in the Red Sea

Personal name
First name / given name
Tiran of Armenia, a 4th-century AD king of Armenia
Tiran Alles, Sri Lankan businessmen, politician and MP
Tiran Nersoyan (1904–1989), Armenian Apostolic Church clergyman, Patriarch-elect of the Armenian Patriarchate of Jerusalem briefly in 1957-1958 
Tiran Porter (born 1948), American bass and guitar player, vocalist and composer, member of The Doobie Brothers

Family name
Itay Tiran (born 1980), Israeli stage and screen actor
Virgil Tiran, Chicago-based American real estate developer
Irena Yebuah Tiran (born 1974),  Slovenian mezzo-soprano opera singer of Ghana descent

Others
 Tiran tank, Israeli modification of T-54, T-55 and T-62 tanks

See also
Tirana, capital city of Albania
Tirano, Italian municipality in Lombardy
Diran (disambiguation)
Tigran (disambiguation)